William Lloyd Warner (October 26, 1898 – May 23, 1970) was a pioneering anthropologist and sociologist noted for applying the techniques of British functionalism to understanding American culture.

Background 
William Lloyd Warner was born in Redlands, California, into the family of William Taylor and Clara Belle Carter, middle-class farmers. Warner attended San Bernardino High School, after which he joined the army in 1917. He contracted tuberculosis in 1918 and was released from the service. In 1918 he married Billy Overfield, but the marriage lasted only briefly.

Warner enrolled in the University of California, Berkeley, where he studied English and became associated with the Socialist Party.

In 1921, he transferred to New York to pursue a career in acting. The plan did not work well, and Warner returned to Berkeley to complete his studies in English.

At Berkeley, he met Robert H. Lowie, professor of anthropology, who encouraged him to turn to anthropology. Warner became fascinated by the work of Bronislaw Malinowski and A. R. Radcliffe-Brown, who introduced him to the British functionalist approach to social anthropology. He also developed friendships with anthropologists Alfred L. Kroeber and Theodora Kroeber. Warner received his B.A. from Berkeley in 1925.

Research in Australia
From 1926 to 1929, Warner spent three years as a researcher for the Rockefeller Foundation and the Australian National Research Council, studying the Murngin people of Arnhem Land in northern Australia with his base at the Milingimbi Methodist Mission. He formed a deep friendship with Mahkarolla, his main Murrgin informant, whom he described in an appendix to his 1947 book. From 1929 to 1935, Warner studied at Harvard in the department of anthropology and the Business School, trying to obtain his Ph.D. He used his study among Murngin for his dissertation, which was later published in his first book, A Black Civilization: A Social Study of an Australian Tribe (1937). He never defended the thesis, and accordingly, did not receive his doctoral degree.

While at Harvard, Warner taught at the Graduate School of Business Administration. From 1930 to 1935, he conducted his most influential study, which was known by the name The Yankee City project. In 1932, he married Mildred Hall, with whom he had three children.

Career at Harvard
Warner enrolled at Harvard (1929–1935) as a graduate student in the Department of Anthropology and the Graduate School of Business School Administration. His first book, A Black Civilization: A Social Study of an Australian Tribe (1937), followed the conventional anthropological path of studying so-called "primitive people."

During his years at Harvard, he became a member of a group of social scientists, led by Australian social psychologist Elton Mayo, the father of the Human Relations Movement, best known for his discovery of the Hawthorne Effect in the course of his motivational research at the Western Electric Company. Mayo was exploring the social and psychological dimensions of industrial settings, and stimulated Warner's interest in contemporary society. Warner became involved in Mayo's project of studying the workplace and organizational structure, using the Western Electric Hawthorne plant in Chicago as its location. Warner's contribution consisted in the introduction of anthropological techniques of observation and interviewing, an innovation that helped cultural explanations to emerge from data analysis. He was largely responsible for the design of the third phase of the Hawthorne project known as the Bank Wiring Observation Room (BWOR) which examined how workers actually performed their jobs, as opposed to what they stated they would do during interviews.

Career in Chicago
In 1935, he was appointed professor of anthropology and sociology at the University of Chicago, where he remained until 1959, when he was appointed professor of social research at Michigan State University. During his Chicago years, Warner's research included important studies of black communities in Chicago and the rural South, of a New England community ("Yankee City"/Newburyport, MA), and a Midwestern community ("Jonesville"). In addition to these community studies, Warner researched business leaders and government administrators, as well as producing important books on race, religion, and American society.

Warner's Yankee City study lasted nearly a decade and produced 5 volumes: The Social Life of a Modern Community (1941), The Status System of a Modern Community (1942), The Social Systems of American Ethnic Groups (1945), The Social System of a Modern Factory (1947), and The Living and the Dead: A Study in the Symbolic Life of Americans (1959).

Criticisms
Despite his impressive productivity and wide range of interests, Warner's work has long been out of fashion. The noted Marxist sociologist Oliver Cromwell Cox's vigorous critique of Warner's framing of race in the Southern US as caste contributed to the disappearance of this once-fashionable conception. An empiricist in an era when the social disciplines were increasingly theoretical, fascinated with economic and social inequality in a time when Americans were eager to deny its significance, and implicitly skeptical of the possibilities of legislating social change at a time when many social scientists were eager to be policymakers, Warner's focus on uncomfortable subjects made his work unfashionable. Warner's interest in communities (when the social science mainstream was stressing the importance of urbanization) and religion (when the fields' leaders were aggressively secularist) also helped to marginalize his work. More positive assessments of his work have recently emerged.

Sources
 Easton, John. 2001. Consuming Interests. University of Chicago Magazine 93(6)
 Marquand, John P. 1939. Wickford Point.
 Marquand, John P. 1947. Point of No Return.
 Warner, W. Lloyd. 1967. The Emergent American Society.
 Warner, W. Lloyd. 1963.  The American Federal Executive: A Study of the Social and Personal Characteristics of the Civil Service.
 Warner, W. Lloyd. 1963. Big Business Leaders in America.
 Warner, W. Lloyd. 1962. The Corporation in the Emergent American Society.
 Warner, W. Lloyd. 1961. The Family of God: A Symbolic Study of Christian Life in America.
 Warner, W. Lloyd. 1960. Social class in America: A Manual of Procedure for the Measurement of Social Status.
 Warner, W. Lloyd. 1959. The Living and the Dead: A Study of the Symbolic Life of Americans.
 Warner, W. Lloyd (ed.). 1959. Industrial Man: Businessmen and Business Organizations.
 Warner, W. Lloyd. 1955. Big Business Leaders in America,
 Warner, W. Lloyd. 1955. Occupational Mobility in American Business and Industry, 1928–1952.
 Warner, W. Lloyd. 1953. American Life: Dream and Reality.
 Warner, W. Lloyd. 1952. Structure of American Life.
 Warner, W. Lloyd. 1949. Democracy in Jonesville; A Study of Quality and Inequality.
 Warner, W. Lloyd. 1949. Social Class in America: A Manual of Procedure for the Measurement of Social Status.
 Warner, W. Lloyd. 1948. The Radio Day Time Serial: A Symbolic Analysis.
 Warner, W. Lloyd. 1947. The Social System of the Modern Factory. The Strike: A Social Analysis.
 Warner, W. Lloyd. 1946. Who Shall Be Educated? The Challenge of Unequal Opportunities.
 Warner, W. Lloyd. 1945. The Social Systems of American Ethnic Groups.
 Warner, W. Lloyd. 1944. Who Shall Be Educated? The Challenge of Unequal Opportunities.
 Warner, W. Lloyd. 1942. The Status System of a Modern Community.
 Warner, W. Lloyd. 1941. Color and Human Nature: Negro Personality Development in a Northern City.
 Warner, W. Lloyd. 1937. A Black Civilization: A Social Study of an Australian Tribe.

Notes

Citations

Sources

External links
Guide to the W. Lloyd Warner Papers 1913-1981 at the University of Chicago Special Collections Research Center

1898 births
1970 deaths
Social psychologists
People from Redlands, California
20th-century American anthropologists
UC Berkeley College of Letters and Science alumni
Harvard Business School faculty
University of Chicago faculty
Michigan State University faculty